European route E 34 (E 34) is a west–east European route, running from Zeebrugge in Belgium, through the Netherlands, to Bad Oeynhausen in Germany.

The highway is maintained by Rijkswaterstaat.

Route description

History

Exit list

See also

References

External links

034
Motorways in Limburg (Netherlands)
Motorways in North Brabant